Arthur Chen (born 2000) is a Chinese-American actor.

Arthur Chen may also refer to:

Arthur Y. Chen, Taiwanese politician, Minister of Public Construction Commission (1995–1996)
Chen Yi-min (born 1956), Taiwanese politician and doctor, member of the 9th Legislative Yuan (2016–2020)

See also
Arthur Chin (1913–1997), Chinese-American pilot who served in the Republic of China Air Force during World War II